Diéouzon is a town in western Ivory Coast. It is a sub-prefecture of Bangolo Department in Guémon Region, Montagnes District.

Diéouzon was a commune until March 2012, when it became one of 1126 communes nationwide that were abolished.

In 2014, the population of the sub-prefecture of Diéouzon was 31,009.

Villages
The 6 villages of the sub-prefecture of Diéouzon and their population in 2014 are:
 Baibly (12 357)
 Bouobly (1 917)
 Diéouzon (4 999)
 Douékpé (4 252)
 Gonié-Tahouaké (6 429)
 Sébazon (1 055)

Notes

Sub-prefectures of Guémon
Former communes of Ivory Coast